The Supercopa Euroamericana was a friendly football tournament created by DirecTV played from 2015 to 2016 in the Americas. It was contested between the Copa Sudamericana and the UEFA Europa League winners. The match was organised by DirecTV in 2015 and LaLiga World Challenge in 2016.

Format
The match was played for 90 minutes. In case of a draw after regulation, the winners were determined via a penalty shoot-out.

List of finals
 The "Season" column refers to the season the competition was held, and wikilinks to the article about that season.
 The wikilinks in the "Score" column point to the article about that season's final game.

Performances

By club

By country

Performances by confederation

See also
 FIFA Club World Cup
 Copa EuroAmericana

References

External links
Supercopa Euroamericana: Official site
Soccerway.com - Supercopa Euroamericana/
The Final Ball.com - Supercopa Euroamericana
Sportstats.com - Supercopa Euroamericana

 
Association football friendly trophies
Recurring sporting events established in 2015
Recurring sporting events disestablished in 2016